Privolzhsky District is an administrative and municipal district (raion), one of the eleven in Astrakhan Oblast, Russia. It is located in the south of the oblast. Its administrative center is the rural locality (a selo) of Nachalovo. Population:  38,649 (2002 Census);  The population of Nachalovo accounts for 12.5% of the district's total population.

Ethnic Russians are the biggest ethnic group in the district and make up around 39% of its population. Ethnic minorities include Tatars (30%), Kazakhs (16%) and Turkmens (4%).

Geography
The entire district lies within the delta of the Volga River, although it is separated from the Caspian Sea by Kamyzyaksky District.

References

Notes

Sources

Districts of Astrakhan Oblast
 

